The term swing refers to the extent of change in voter support, typically from one election or opinion poll to another, expressed as a positive or negative percentage point. For the Australian House of Representatives and the lower houses of the parliaments of all the states and territories except Tasmania and the ACT, Australia employs preferential voting in single-member constituencies. Under the full-preference instant-runoff voting system, in each seat the candidate with the lowest vote is eliminated and their preferences are distributed, which is repeated until only two candidates remain. While every seat has a two-candidate preferred (TCP) result, seats where the major parties have come first and second are commonly referred to as having a two-party-preferred (TPP) result. The concept of "swing" in Australian elections is not simply a function of the difference between the votes of the two leading candidates, as it is in Britain. To know the majority of any seat, and therefore the swing necessary for it to change hands, it is necessary to know the preferences of all the voters, regardless of their first preference votes. It is not uncommon in Australia for candidates who have comfortable leads on the first count to fail to win the seat, because "preference flows" go against them.

TPP/TCP swings
In seats where the major parties do not come first and second, differing TPP and TCP results are returned. Whilst each seat that preferences down to two major party candidates has the same TPP as TCP, in seats not contested by a major party, such as at some by-elections or some seats in some state elections, only a TCP vote can be produced. At federal elections, it is possible to calculate a TPP/TCP majority for every seat. The swing is therefore what is required for that seat to change hands at the next election.

Swings in Australian parliaments are more commonly associated with the TPP vote. While seats are normally referred to on TPP terms, when one of the remaining two candidates after preference distribution are not from a major party, it is referred to as a TCP, with a different TPP produced. In a TCP contest between Labor and the Nationals and without a Liberal candidate, this is also considered a TPP, with the Nationals considered a de facto major party within the Liberal–National Coalition. At the 2013 federal election, only 11 of 150 seats returned differing TPP and TCP figures ("non-classic seats"), indicating a considerable two-party system.

The Mackerras pendulum takes the TPP majorities of all electorates and arranges them in order, from the seat with the highest government majority to the seat with the highest opposition majority. For example, ahead of the 2007 election, Labor needed to win a minimum of 16 additional seats to form a government, and the 16th-weakest government seat (McMillan) had a TPP majority of 4.9 points. Thus, the pendulum predicted that Labor would need a uniform TPP swing of 4.9 points to win the 2007 election. Labor in fact gained a swing of 5.6 points, which the pendulum had predicted would result in 21 additional Labor seats under a uniform swing. In fact, Labor gained 23 seats, and not all seats that changed hands were those with the slimmest Coalition majorities, because swings in each district are unique and not uniform.

Examples

Federal, Adelaide 2004 

It can be seen that the Liberal candidate had a primary vote lead over the Labor candidate. In first-past-the-post voting, the Liberals would have retained the seat, and their majority would be said to be 3.4 percentage points (45.3 − 41.9).

However, under full-preference instant-runoff voting, the votes of all the minor candidates were distributed as follows:

Thus, Labor defeated the Liberals, with 85 percent of Green and Green-preferenced voters preferencing Labor on the last distribution. Labor's TPP/TCP vote was 51.3 percent, a TPP/TCP majority of 1.3 points, and a TPP/TCP swing of 1.9 points compared with the previous election.

South Australia, Frome 2009

The 2009 Frome by-election was closely contested, with the result being uncertain for over a week. Liberal leader Martin Hamilton-Smith claimed victory on behalf of the party. The result hinged on the performance of Brock against Labor in the competition for second place. Brock polled best in the Port Pirie area, and received enough eliminated candidate preferences to end up ahead of the Labor candidate by 30 votes.

Brock received 80 percent of Labor's fifth-count preferences to achieve a TCP vote of 51.72 percent (a majority of 665 votes) against the Liberal candidate. The by-election saw a rare TPP swing to an incumbent government, and was the first time an opposition had lost a seat at a by-election in South Australia. The result in Frome at the 2010 state election saw Brock come first on primary votes, increasing his primary vote by 14.1 points to a total of 37.7 percent and his TCP vote by 6.5 points to a total of 58.2 percent. Despite a statewide swing against Labor at the election, Labor again increased its TPP vote in Frome by 1.8 points up to 49.9%.

Federal, Melbourne 2010

In this example, the two remaining candidates/parties, one a minor party, were the same after preference distribution at both this election and the previous election. Therefore, differing TPP and TCP votes, margins, and swings resulted.

South Australia, Port Adelaide 2012

At the 2012 Port Adelaide state by-election, only a TCP could be produced, as the Liberal Party of Australia (and Family First Party and independent candidate Max James), who contested the previous election and gained a primary vote of 26.8 percent (and 5.9 percent, and 11.0 percent respectively), did not contest the by-election. On a TPP margin of 12.8 percent from the 2010 election, considered a safe margin on the current pendulum, Labor would have likely retained their TPP margin based on unchanged statewide Newspoll since the previous election. Labor retained the seat on a 52.9 percent TCP against Johanson after the distribution of preferences. Unlike previous examples, neither a TPP or TCP swing can be produced, as the 2010 result was between Labor and Liberal rather than Labor and independent with no Liberal candidate. An increase or decrease in margins in these situations cannot be meaningfully interpreted as swings. As explained by the ABC's Antony Green, when a major party does not contest a by-election, preferences from independents or minor parties that would normally flow to both major parties does not take place, causing asymmetric preference flows. Examples of this are the 2008 Mayo and 2002 Cunningham federal by-elections, with seats returning to TPP form at the next election.

References

Elections in Australia
Psephology